Setauket Presbyterian Church and Burial Ground, also known as First Presbyterian Church of Brookhaven, is a historic Presbyterian  church and cemetery at 5 Caroline Avenue in the hamlet of Setauket, Suffolk County, New York.

History
The church was built in 1812 in the Federal style and is a three-by-five-bay, heavy timber framed,  building sheathed in wood shingles and covered by a gable roof. The center bay features an  bell tower / narthex.  The burial ground was established in the 1660s and contains approximately 800 gravesites.   The church grounds were the site of a Loyalist fortification that was attacked by Continental Army forces from Connecticut in August 1777.

Prior to this, existed an earlier presbyterian church on the village green, which was later burned down after being struck by lightning. The present church was rebuilt in 1812.

The burial ground contains the remains of some of the earliest pastors of the church including Nathaniel Brewster (1600–1690), George Phillips (1660–1739) (grandson of Rev. George Phillips), and Benjamin Talmadge (1723–1786) (father of Benjamin Tallmadge), among others.  Also many of the founding families of the area are buried here including the Bayles, Davis, Dickinsons, Floyds. Hawkins, Jaynes, Jones, Satterlys, Smiths and Woodhulls, including the resting place of Abraham Woodhull, leader of the Culper spy ring against the British during the American Revolution. As Setauket was his home town, artist William Sidney Mount (1807–1868) is buried here too.

The church and burial ground were added to the National Register of Historic Places in 1996.

Images

References

External links

 Setauket Presbyterian Church official site
 

Presbyterian churches in New York (state)
Churches on the National Register of Historic Places in New York (state)
Federal architecture in New York (state)
Churches completed in 1812
Churches in Suffolk County, New York
Protestant Reformed cemeteries
Cemeteries in Suffolk County, New York
National Register of Historic Places in Suffolk County, New York